Hengsbach is a German surname. Notable people with the surname include:

 Franz Hengsbach (1910–1991), German Roman Catholic theologian, priest, Cardinal, Bishop of Essen
 Friedhelm Hengsbach (born 1937), Roman Catholic social ethician

German-language surnames